The Louisiana Philharmonic Orchestra (LPO) is an American orchestra based in New Orleans, Louisiana.  It is the only full-time, professional orchestra in the Gulf South. The orchestra performs at the Orpheum Theater.

The Louisiana Philharmonic Orchestra's music director is Carlos Miguel Prieto. The LPO performs a full 36-week concert season featuring an array of Classics, Casual Classics, Family, Education, and Outreach concerts, as well as Special Events. The members of the LPO are home-based in New Orleans and serve the Gulf South region.
  LPO is the longest-standing musician-governed and collaboratively operated professional symphony in the United States.

History

The LPO was founded in September 1991 upon the demise that year of the New Orleans Philharmonic-Symphony Orchestra, as it was called, by musicians from that ensemble; music director Maxim Shostakovich did not continue, however.

The LPO's first music director was Klauspeter Seibel (1936–2011), until his retirement in 2005. His work was widely praised in eulogies of his death in Hamburg, Germany, on January 8, 2011.

Hurricane Katrina in August 2005 caused the LPO's musicians to evacuate.  Their venue, the Orpheum Theater, flooded.  Members of the orchestra began performing at alternate locations in 2006. One of these locations was Palmer Park.

The Orpheum Theater reopened in August 2015. Its inaugural gala took place on September 17: a concert by the LPO. The orchestra has since established itself as anchor tenant of the venue.  The LPO also performs at the Mahalia Jackson Theater for the Performing Arts for films and large productions.  

The LPO also serves as the orchestra for New Orleans Opera Association and Delta Festival Ballet that began in 1976 (as New Orleans Philharmonic-Symphony Orchestra) for a co-presentation of Sleeping Beauty.

Music Directors 
Klauspeter Seibel (1991-2005)

Carlos Miguel Prieto (2005-Current)

See also
Klauspeter Seibel in the German Wikipedia.
Jeannette Knoll

References

External links
 Louisiana Philharmonic Orchestra
 Orpheum Theater, New Orleans
 Uniquely New Orleans - The Classical Tradition and Jazz on YouTube

American orchestras
Musical groups from New Orleans
Musical groups established in 1991
Wikipedia requested audio of orchestras
Performing arts in Louisiana
1991 establishments in Louisiana